Jamie Mattie (born June 28, 1980 in Antigonish, Nova Scotia) is a Canadian-born Austrian ice hockey defenceman he previous played for the Graz 99ers of the Austrian Hockey League.He currently plays for the Heatherton Warriors of the Antigonish Rural Hockey league.

Playing career
Mattie has played entirely in Europe since turning pro in 2002, beginning his career in Finland playing in the SM-liiga with JYP and then in Sweden playing in Division 1 with IK Pantern.
In 2003 he moved to Austria playing for Graz 99ers.  He has also represented his adopted country Austria in the World Hockey Championship.

Career statistics

International play
Played for Austria in:

2007- World Championships

International statistics

References

External links

1980 births
Austrian ice hockey players
Cape Breton Screaming Eagles players
Canadian ice hockey defencemen
Graz 99ers players
Ice hockey people from Nova Scotia
JYP Jyväskylä players
Living people
People from Antigonish, Nova Scotia
Canadian expatriate ice hockey players in Austria
Canadian expatriate ice hockey players in Finland